Tajuria dominus is a butterfly in the family Lycaenidae. It was described by Hamilton Herbert Druce in 1895. It is found in the Indomalayan realm.

Subspecies
Tajuria dominus dominus (Borneo, Peninsular Malaya, Singapore, possibly Sumatra)
Tajuria dominus pisatis Fruhstorfer, 1912 (Java, Bawean)

Tajuria mizunumai was previously listed as a subspecies of Tajuria dominus, but was raised to species status.

References

External links
Tajuria at Markku Savela's Lepidoptera and Some Other Life Forms

Tajuria
Butterflies described in 1895